Taringa railway station was a ground level stopping place during the passenger transport days of the Willunga railway line which opened in 1915, and a 1965 reference mentioned that it was no longer used at that date.

The Willunga railway line was dismantled in 1972 and later replaced by the Coast to Vines Rail Trail. Taringa is marked by a picnic shelter near Binney Road between McLaren Vale and Willunga.

References

Australian Railway Historical Society Bulletin No 336, October 1965

Disused railway stations in South Australia